Casey Dunne  (born 25 November 1984), also known by the nicknames of "Dunney", "The Pikey Prince" and "The Big Deal Dunne", is an Irish professional rugby league footballer who plays as a er or fullback for Longhorns RL in the ROI League and Ireland at international level.

Dunne has also won the Towns cup and all-Ireland cup with his rugby union club Ashbourne RFC along with intermediate and junior championships in GAA with his hometown club; Duleek/Bellewstown GAA.

Dunne is an Irish international. In 2016 he was called up to the Ireland squad for the 2017 Rugby League World Cup European qualifiers.

Dunne was named in the Ireland squad for the 2017 Rugby League World Cup.

Domestically he is player-coach for Longhorns RL, who he guided to All-Ireland champions in 2017.

References

External links
(archived by web.archive.org) Statistics at rlwc2017.com

1987 births
Living people
Ireland national rugby league team captains
Ireland national rugby league team players
Irish rugby league coaches
Irish rugby league players
Longhorns RL players
Rugby league fullbacks
Rugby league players from County Meath
Rugby league wingers